The 101st Proposal (also known as My Perfect Girl) is a 2006 South Korean television series starring Lee Moon-sik and Park Sun-young. It aired on SBS from May 29 to July 25, 2006, on Mondays and Tuesdays at 21:55 (KST) for 15 episodes.

It is a remake of the Japanese drama  which aired on Fuji TV in 1991.

Plot
Perennial bachelor Park Dal-jae (Lee Moon-sik) has gone on more marriage blind dates than he can count, but he still can't find a wife. It's a tough market since he's not young, good-looking, or rich, but he's got his heart in the right place. On his 100th date, he finally meets the perfect girl, 29-year-old announcer Han Soo-jung (Park Sun-young).

The death of her first love, Chan-hyuk, has put Soo-jung's life at a standstill. Her aunt badgers her into going on a blind date with Dal-jae, and Soo-jung is amazed that he says exactly the same words Chan-hyuk had said when he proposed to her.

She gets angry when she later learns that he'd been coached by his younger brother. Soo-jung tries to keep treating him coldly, but Dal-jae's pure-hearted naivete makes her smile. As Soo-jung gradually opens up to him, Dal-jae becomes hopeful that she'll someday return his feelings. But then Woo-suk (Jung Sung-hwan), who looks exactly like Chan-hyuk, suddenly appears in Soo-jung's life.

Cast

Main
Lee Moon-sik as Park Dal-jae 
Park Sun-young as Han Soo-jung
Song Chang-eui as Seo Hyun-joon
 as Jung Woo-suk

Supporting
Im Hyun-sik as Park Chang-man
 as Park Min-jae
Hong Soo-ah as Han Geum-jung
Choi Ran as Jang Eun-im
 as Yeom Sun-ja
Jo Eun-sook as Noh Jung-soon
 as Noh Chae-young
Jeong Kyung-ho as Oh Yong-pil
Lee Joon-gi as himself (cameo)

References

External links
  
 

Seoul Broadcasting System television dramas
2006 South Korean television series debuts
2006 South Korean television series endings
Korean-language television shows
South Korean romantic comedy television series
Television shows written by Choi Wan-kyu